Surjeet Singh Panesar (24 June 1938 – 6 November 2019) was a Kenyan field hockey player. He competed at the 1960, 1964, 1968 and the 1972 Summer Olympics.

References

External links
 

1938 births
2019 deaths
Kenyan male field hockey players
Olympic field hockey players of Kenya
Field hockey players at the 1960 Summer Olympics
Field hockey players at the 1964 Summer Olympics
Field hockey players at the 1968 Summer Olympics
Field hockey players at the 1972 Summer Olympics
Sportspeople from Nairobi
Kenyan people of Indian descent
Kenyan people of Punjabi descent
Punjabi University alumni